There have been two baronetcies created for persons with the surname Skeffington, one in the Baronetage of England and one in the Baronetage of Great Britain.

The Skeffington Baronetcy, of Fishwerwick in the County of Stafford, was created in the Baronetage of England on 8 May 1627. For more information on this creation, see Viscount Massereene and Ferrard

The Farrell-Skeffington, later Skeffington Baronetcy, of Skeffington in the County of Leicester, was created in the Baronetage of Great Britain on 27 June 1786 for William Farrell-Skeffington. The second Baronet used the surname Skeffington only. The title became extinct on his death in 1850.

Skeffington baronets, of Fisherwick (1627)
see Viscount Massereene and Ferrard

Farrell-Skeffington, later Skeffington baronets, of Skeffington (1786)
Sir William Charles Farrell-Skeffington, 1st Baronet (1742–1815)
Sir Lumley St George Skeffington, 2nd Baronet (1771–1850)

References

Extinct baronetcies in the Baronetage of England
Extinct baronetcies in the Baronetage of Great Britain